Agibalovo is the name of several rural localities in Russia:
Agibalovo, Sudbishchensky Selsoviet, Novoderevenkovsky District, Oryol Oblast, a village in Sudbishchensky Selsoviet of Novoderevenkovsky District in Oryol Oblast
Agibalovo, Surovsky Selsoviet, Novoderevenkovsky District, Oryol Oblast, a village in Surovsky Selsoviet of Novoderevenkovsky District in Oryol Oblast
Agibalovo, Smolensk Oblast, a village in Agibalovskoye Rural Settlement of Kholm-Zhirkovsky District in Smolensk Oblast